Paul "Stump" Evans (October 18, 1904 – August 29, 1928) was an American musician, who was one of the first jazz saxophonists.

Evans experimented with several instruments: alto horn, trombone, and alto saxophone. In the 1920s, he played baritone saxophone in Chicago as a member of the Creole Jazz Band led by King Oliver and the Dixie Syncopators. He played C melody saxophone when he supported singer Priscilla Stewart. With Oliver he played soprano saxophone, then alto saxophone with the Red Hot Peppers led by Jelly Roll Morton. Evans also worked as a sideman for Erskine Tate and Jimmy Wade.

He died at the age of 23 from tuberculosis.

References

1904 births
1928 deaths
20th-century American saxophonists
American jazz saxophonists